Ondřej Cverna (born 30 July 1990) is a professional Czech football player who currently plays for MFK Karviná.

Career
After 15 years, ŠSK Bílovec announced on their Facebook page in March 2019, that Cverna had returned to the club.

References

External links
 
 Ondřej Cverna at Footballdatabase

1990 births
Living people
Czech footballers
Czech First League players
FC Baník Ostrava players
MFK Karviná players
Association football midfielders